is a music video game created by Masaya Matsuura as a spin-off of his 1999 music game, Vib-Ribbon, which was released for PlayStation. A direct sequel called Vib-Ripple was released in 2004. The releases are comparable to the releases of the earlier PaRappa series (also a Matsuura series) where the original was followed by a pseudo-sequel and then a direct sequel a few years later.

Whereas in Vib-Ribbon the gameplay centered on the player's interaction with the melody of the song being played, in Mojib-Ribbon the gameplay centers on the player's interaction with the lyrics. As such, the music employed in the game is heavily lyrics-oriented rap music. The game's art-style is centered on traditional sumi-e and Japanese kana calligraphy. This has led to claims that the game is incomprehensible to non-Japanese audiences, however the simplicity of gameplay have allowed numerous import gamers (typically also fans of Masaya Matsuura's works) to enjoy the game as well, and guides exist online regarding menu navigation instructions for non-Japanese speakers.

Gameplay 
In each level, Mojibri walks around a circle of clouds as rap lyrics written in kana pass underneath. The player must press up on the joystick to get Mojibri to dip his fude in the suzuri and then down to get Mojibri to write the kana as he sings it. The songs are heavily rhythm-based raps, and the player must time the application of the fude to the washi during lyrics and to the suzuri during breaks.

Later in the game Mojibri is joined by a female friend named  and a huge robot called . These characters have individual calligraphy styles.

Development 
Mojib-Ribbon was initially teased as Vib-Ribbon 2 before being revealed at the 2002 Game Developers Conference. Masaya Matsuura and J-pop band Laugh and Peace returned from Vib-Ribbon to compose Mojib-Ribbon'''s music, with the lyrics written by Japanese rap pioneer Seiko Ito. Mojib-Ribbon was originally planned to be released in Europe, with Matsuura also working to get it published in America.

 See also Ōkami, a 2006 video game done in the Ink and wash painting (sumi-e'') style

References

External links

2003 video games
Hip hop mass media
Japan-exclusive video games
Music video games
PlayStation 2 games
PlayStation 2-only games
Video games developed in Japan
Multiplayer and single-player video games
Sony Interactive Entertainment games
Rhythm games
NanaOn-Sha games